Li-La is the sixth album from Yoko Takahashi.

Track listing

References 

1997 albums
Yoko Takahashi albums